Alphonsa of the Immaculate Conception or Saint Alphonsa, christened at birth as Anna Muttathupadathu (19 August 1910– 28 July 1946),  was a nun and an educator by vocation (profession). She was also known for being a victim soul, visionary and prophetess in the Kottayam pergunna of the erstwhile Travancore province of British India, in the present-day Kerala, India. She is the first woman of Indian origin to be canonised as a saint after decades of enquiry by the Sacred Congregation for the Causes of Saints, she is also the first saint of the Syro-Malabar Church, an Eastern Catholic community of Eastern Christianity.

In the 1990s, a postal stamp commemorating Alphonsa was published by Kerala state's former minister, K Karunakaran.

Life

Early life 
Alphonsa was born as Annakutty Muttathupadathu in a Malankara Nasrani family to Joseph Muttathupadathil and Mary Puthukari in Kudamalloor, near Kottayam, on 19 August 1910. She was baptised on 27 August. Alphonsamma, as she was locally known, was born in Arpookara, a village in the princely state of Travancore, what would become Kerala state. The village lies within the Archeparchy of Changanassery.

Her parents nicknamed her Annakutty (little Anna). She had a difficult childhood characterised by the loss of a parent. Her mother died early, so her maternal aunt helped to raise her. Hagiographies describe her early life as one of hardships at the hands of her stern aunt and foster mother and one of teasing by schoolmates. Anna was educated by her great-uncle, Joseph Muttathupadathu. When Anna was three-years-old, she contracted eczema and suffered for over a year.

In 1916, Anna started school in Arpookara. She received her First Communion on 27 November 1917. When the first school cycle ended in 1920, the time had come to transfer to Muttuchira, to the house of her aunt Anna Murickan, to whom her mother had entrusted get, before she died. She was raised in the Murickan family, which was an age-old and prominent family in the area. As a child her grandmother would tell her stories of saints, teach prayers& Christian songs. As an adolescent Anna received many marriage proposals from reputed families. However, she had a feeling in her mind that she wants to be a bride of Christ and do good things for people. In these years, Thérèse of Lisieux appeared and told her that she will one day become a saint. There are many similarities in the lives of Anna and Thérèse, and she was Anna's all-time favorite patron saint and role model.

Anna sacrificed her material fortune and wanted to dedicate her life to Jesus Christ. In 1923, Anna's feet were burnt when she fell into a pit of burning chaff; local hagiographies describe this as a self-inflicted injury in order to avoid her foster mother's attempt to arrange a marriage for her and thereby to fulfill her desire for becoming a religious sister instead. This accident left her partially disabled for the rest of her life.

Sister Alphonsa 
When it became possible, Anna joined the Franciscan Clarist Congregation, a religious congregation of the Third Order of St. Francis, and through them, completed her schooling.

Anna arrived at the Clarist convent at Bharananganam, Kottayam district, on Pentecost Sunday 1927. She received the postulant's veil on 2 August 1928 and took the name Alphonsa of the Immaculate Conception in honor of Alphonsus Liguori, whose feast day it was. In May 1929 Alphonsa was assigned to teach at Malayalam High School at Vazhappally. Her foster mother died in 1930. She resumed her studies at Changanacherry, while working as a temporary teacher at a school at Vakakkad. On 19 May 1930 Alphonsa entered the novitiate of the congregation at Bharananganam. On 11 August 1931 she completed the novitiate and took her first vows. And became a religious in the Catholic Church.

Health decline 
The period 1930–1935 was characterised by grave illness. Alphonsa took her permanent vows on 12 August 1936. Two days later she returned to Bharananganam from Changanacherry. She then taught high school at St. Alphonsa Girl's High School, but was often sick and unable to teach. For most of her years as a Clarist sister she endured serious illness.

In December 1936, it is claimed that she was cured from her ailments through the intervention of the Kuriakose Elias Chavara (who was beatified at the same ceremony as she), but on 14 June 1939 she was struck by a severe attack of pneumonia which left her weakened. On 18 October 1940, a thief entered her room in the middle of the night. This traumatic event caused her to suffer amnesia and weakened her again.

Her health continued to deteriorate over a period of months. She received extreme unction on 29 September 1941. The next day it is believed that she regained her memory, though not complete health. Her health improved over the next few years, until in July 1945 she developed gastroenteritis and liver problems that caused violent convulsions and vomiting. During the last year of her life she came to know Sebastian Valopilly (later Bishop of Kerala) who frequently brought her communion. This bishop became famous in Kerala for championing the cause of poor people from all religious backgrounds who had come to live in Thalassery as a result of shortages elsewhere.

Death 
After a series of serious health problems, she died on 28 July 1946, at a young age of 35. She was buried at St. Mary's Catholic Church, Bharananganam, Travancore (present day Kottayam district) in the Diocese of Palai. Her death news made her loved ones sad. Many people came to see Alphonsa's funeral.

Veneration 
Claims of her miraculous intervention began almost immediately upon her death and often involved the children of the convent school where she used to teach. On 2 December 1953, Cardinal Eugène Tisserant inaugurated the diocesan process for her beatification and Alphonsa was declared a Servant of God.

In 1985, Pope John Paul II formally approved a miracle attributed to her intercession and on 9 July she became "Venerable Sister Alphonsa".

Beatification 
Alphonsa was beatified along with Kuriakose Elias Chavara at Kottayam, on 8 February 1986 by Pope John Paul II during his apostolic pilgrimage to India.

During his speech at Nehru Stadium, the Pope said:
 From early in her life, Sister Alphonsa experienced great suffering. With the passing of the years, the heavenly Father gave her an ever fuller share in the Passion of his beloved Son. We recall how she experienced not only physical pain of great intensity, but also the spiritual suffering of being misunderstood and misjudged by others. But she constantly accepted all her sufferings with serenity and trust in God. ... She wrote to her spiritual director: "Dear Father, as my good Lord Jesus loves me so very much, I sincerely desire to remain on this sick bed and suffer not only this, but anything else besides, even to the end of the world. I feel now that God has intended my life to be an oblation, a sacrifice of suffering" (20 November 1944). She came to love suffering because she loved the suffering Christ. She learned to love the Cross through her love of the crucified Lord.

Miracles 
Hundreds of miraculous cures are claimed from her intervention, many of them involving straightening of clubbed feet, possibly because of her having lived with deformed feet herself.  Two of these cases were submitted to the Congregation for the Causes of Saints as proof of her miraculous intervention. The continuing cures are chronicled in the magazine PassionFlower.

Bishop Sebastian reported:  About ten years ago, when I was in a small village in Wayanad outside Manatavady, I saw a boy walking with some difficulty, using a stick. As he approached me I noted that both of his feet were turned upside down. I had a stack of holy cards in my pocket with Alphonsa's picture on them, so I pulled one of them out and gave it to the boy. When I told the boy that he should pray to this woman for the cure of his feet, the boy – he was quite smart for a ten-year-old boy – replied: "But I'm a Muslim, and, besides, I was born this way." I replied that God is very powerful, so let's pray. A few months later, a boy and a gentleman appeared at the house here. I didn't recognize them at first but soon learned that it was the Muslim boy with his father, here to tell me that his feet had been cured through their prayers to Sister Alphonsa. They showed me the calluses on the tops of his feet, and you could see the marks which had been made from the years of his walking with his feet turned under. Before they left, the three of us had our pictures taken.

The boy had reportedly taken Alphonsa's picture card and asked Alphonsa to help fix his feet. Several days afterwards one of his feet supposedly turned around. He and the other members of his family then prayed for the cure of the second foot, which also supposedly turned around later.

Canonization 

On Sunday, 12 October 2008, Pope Benedict XVI announced her canonization at a ceremony at Saint Peter's Square. Indians from across the world, especially people from Kerala, gathered at the ceremony in Rome. Among them was a 10-year-old Kerala boy Jinil Joseph whose clubfoot – a birth defect – was, in the judgment of Vatican officials, miraculously healed after prayers to Alphonsa in 1999.

The final ceremony for the canonization began with the holy relics of Alphonsa being presented to the Pope by Sister Celia, Mother General of the Franciscan Clarist Congregation, the congregation to which Alphonsa belonged. Celia was accompanied by Vice Postulator Francis Vadakkel and former Kerala minister K. M. Mani, all holding lit candles.  Speaking in English, the Pope declared Alphonsa a saint, after reading excerpts from the Bible. The Pope himself read out the biography of Alphonsa after the ceremony.

In the homily, Pope Benedict XVI recalled Alphonsa's life as one of "extreme physical and spiritual suffering".

  This exceptional woman ... was convinced that her cross was the very means of reaching the heavenly banquet prepared for her by the Father, By accepting the invitation to the wedding feast, and by adorning herself with the garment of God's grace through prayer and penance, she conformed her life to Christ's and now delights in the "rich fare and choice wines" of the heavenly kingdom. 

"(Her) heroic virtues of patience, fortitude and perseverance in the midst of deep suffering remind us that God always provides the strength we need to overcome every trial," the pope stated before the ceremony ended.

The canonization was greeted with the bursting of firecrackers and the toll of church bells. St Mary's Forane church at Kudmaloor, her home parish, also celebrated a special Mass. The grave at St Mary's Forane Church in Bharananganam where the Franciscan Clarist Sister was buried had a chapel built there, which houses her mortal remains.

Reserve bank of India Issued a 5 Rupees Commemorative Coin in 2009 marking the birth centenary of Alphonsa.

Shrine 
Her tomb at St. Mary's Syro-Malabar Catholic Church, Bharananganam, has become a pilgrimage site as miracles have been reported by some of the faithful.

St. Alphonsa Church Valiyakolly is known as the "Bharanaganam of North Kerala" (unofficial). This church is under the diocese of Thamarassery. Valiyakolly church is the first church named after Alphonsa in the diocese. And hence this church is one of the main pilgrimage centers of Saint Alphonsa in North Kerala. Novena on the name of Saint Alphonsa is being conducted here on every Friday evening

Feast 
Thousands of people converge on the small town of Bharananganam when they celebrate the feast of Saint Alphonsa from 19 to 28 July each year; her tomb has been designated as a pilgrimage site with numerous miracles being reported by pious devotees.

Documentary video 

In 2008, Sibi Yogiaveedan directed a documentary video of Alphonsa, which known as "Vishudha (saint) Alphonsama- The passion flower". In this video the director tries to bring Alphonsa's childhood friends and relatives. Which made the documentary video more interesting because they are sharing the real life experience with Alphonsa. In addition, Alphonsa's character was played by Nikhila Vimal. The video was made in Malayalam language. For this reason, English subtitles have been included.

See also 

 Kuriakose Elias Chavara
 Euphrasia Eluvathingal
 Carmelites of Mary Immaculate
 Saint Thomas Christians
 Cyril Bernard Papali
 Catholic Bishops Conference of India
 Catholic Church in India

References

External links 

 
 St. Alphonsa Anna Muttathupadam of the Immaculate Conception, F. C. C.
 Pope John Paul II On Blessed Alphonsa of India
 Saint Alphonsa
 100 Maxims of the saint
St. Alphonsa documentary on YouTube

1910 births
1946 deaths
20th-century Christian mystics
20th-century Christian saints
20th-century Indian scholars
20th-century Indian women
Beatifications by Pope John Paul II
Canonizations by Pope Benedict XVI
Christian clergy from Kottayam
Christian female saints of the Late Modern era
Christianity in Kerala
Franciscan mystics
Franciscan saints
Indian Eastern Catholic  nuns
Indian Christian mystics
Indian Christian saints
Malayali people
People from Changanassery
Scholars from Kerala
Syro-Malabar Catholics
Syro-Malabar saints
Third Order Regular Franciscans
Women from Kerala
Venerated Catholics by Pope John Paul II
Venerated Catholics from Kerala